Bjarke Halfdan Jacobsen (born 21 August 1993) is a Danish professional footballer who plays as a midfielder for German club SV Wehen Wiesbaden.

Career
Born in Helsinge, Jacobsen is a product of the Nordsjælland youth academy. He later played for FC Helsingør, AB and Vendsyssel before moving to AC Horsens in July 2017.

In June 2021 it was announced that Jacobsen would join 3. Liga club SV Wehen Wiesbaden for the 2021–22 season.

References

1993 births
Living people
People from Gribskov Municipality
Danish men's footballers
Danish expatriate men's footballers
Association football midfielders
Denmark youth international footballers
Danish Superliga players
Danish 1st Division players
Akademisk Boldklub players
Vendsyssel FF players
AC Horsens players
FC Nordsjælland players
FC Helsingør players
SV Wehen Wiesbaden players
Danish expatriate sportspeople in Germany
Expatriate footballers in Germany
Sportspeople from the Capital Region of Denmark